Károly Ferencz (14 October 1913 – 21 June 1984) was a Hungarian sport wrestler. He was born in Budapest. He won a bronze medal in Greco-Roman wrestling, lightweight class, at the 1948 Summer Olympics in London.

References

External links

1913 births
1984 deaths
Martial artists from Budapest
Wrestlers at the 1948 Summer Olympics
Hungarian male sport wrestlers
Olympic wrestlers of Hungary
Olympic bronze medalists for Hungary
Olympic medalists in wrestling
Medalists at the 1948 Summer Olympics
20th-century Hungarian people